Malcolm Smith (23 February 1932 – 9 November 2012) was a South African cricketer. He played ten first-class matches for Natal between 1958 and 1961.

References

External links
 

1932 births
2012 deaths
South African cricketers
KwaZulu-Natal cricketers
Cricketers from Durban